Northern Exposure is an American television series

Northern Exposure may also refer to:

Northern Exposure (album), a 1996 album by Sasha & John Digweed
Northern Exposure, BBC Northern Ireland TV series showcasing locations throughout Northern Ireland
Daylighting, the placing of windows in buildings in the Northern Hemisphere such that they face away from direct sunlight, providing a weaker but more consistent light